Falck Renewables S.p.A. (former name: Actelios) is a renewable energy company based in Milan, Italy. It has an installed capacity of 1,408 MW in Italy, UK, France, Spain, the US, Norway and Sweden. Its activities include the development, financing, construction and operational management of renewable energy plants. Through the expertise of its subsidiary Vector Renewables, Falck Renewables also offers services along the entire value chain.

History

In 2002, the Falck Group's Actelios company, which focuses on the renewable energy market, was founded and listed on the Milan Stock Exchange. In 2010, all the Falck Group's renewable energy production activities were consolidated within Actelios, which changed its name to Falck Renewables S.p.A.

In 2014, through the acquisition of Vector Cuatro (later renamed into Vector Renewables), Falck Renewables entered the market of asset management and technical advisory services for photovoltaic and wind power plants.

Corporate affairs 

The chairman of the company is Mikael Kramer and managing director is Toni Volpe.

In 2021, the company had revenues of €568.4 million.

External links

Engineering companies of Italy
Renewable energy companies of Italy
2002 establishments in Italy
Energy companies established in 2002
Companies based in Milan